RING finger protein 38 is a protein that in humans is encoded by the RNF38 gene.

This gene encodes a protein with a coiled-coil motif and a RING-H2 motif (C3H2C2) at its carboxy-terminus. The RING motif is a zinc-binding domain found in a large set of proteins playing roles in diverse cellular processes including oncogenesis, development, signal transduction, and apoptosis. Alternate transcriptional splice variants, encoding different isoforms, have been characterized.

See also
 RING finger domain

References

Further reading

External links 
 

RING finger proteins